Two-time defending champion Rafael Nadal defeated Roger Federer in a rematch of the previous year's final, 6–4, 6–4 to win the singles tennis title at the 2007 Monte Carlo Masters. He did not lose a single set in the entire tournament.

Seeds
The top eight seeds received a bye into the second round.

Draw

Finals

Section 1

Section 2

Section 3

Section 4

External links
 Singles draw
 Singles qualification draw

Singles